The 1963–64 Iraq Central FA First Division was the 16th season of the Iraq Central FA League (the top division of football in Baghdad and its neighbouring cities from 1948 to 1973). Prior to the season, Aliyat Al-Shorta won promotion by beating Al-Omma 3–1 after extra time on 29 June 1963.

The tournament started on 31 October 1963, and the winners of the league were Al-Quwa Al-Jawiya who earned their third title. Al-Quwa Al-Jawiya's Amer Jameel and Ammo Baba won the top scorer and best player awards respectively. Al-Quwa Al-Jawiya also beat Al-Firqa Al-Thalitha 3–0 in the Iraq Central FA Altruism Cup on 25 May 1964.

Name changes
Montakhab Al-Shorta (select team) replaced by Madaris Al-Shorta (individual team).

League table

Results

References

External links
 Iraqi Football Website

Iraq Central FA League seasons
Iraq
1964 in Iraqi sport
1963 in Iraqi sport